Events from the year 1652 in England.

Incumbents
 Parliament – First Commonwealth Rump

Events
 19 May – First Anglo-Dutch War: Battle of Dover  fought off Dover between Lt.-Admiral Maarten Harpertszoon Tromp's 42 Dutch ships and 21 English ships divided into two squadrons, one commanded by Robert Blake and the other by Nehemiah Bourne.
 13 June – George Fox preaches to a large crowd on Firbank Fell in Westmorland, leading to the establishment of the Religious Society of Friends (Quakers).
 30 June – First Anglo-Dutch War: Britain formally declares war on the Netherlands.
 26 August – First Anglo-Dutch War: An English fleet attacks an outward-bound convoy of the United Provinces escorted by 23 men-of-war and six fire ships commanded by Vice-Commodore Michiel de Ruyter at the Battle of Plymouth; the Dutch escape.
 6 September – First Anglo-Dutch War: Battle of Elba.
 8 October – First Anglo-Dutch War: Battle of the Kentish Knock fought in the North Sea about 30 km from the mouth of the river Thames; the Dutch are forced to withdraw.
 30 November – First Anglo-Dutch War: English under Blake defeated by Dutch under Tromp at the Battle of Dungeness.
 Royal Navy Dockyard established at Harwich.
 Probable date – second coffeehouse in England opened, in London, by Pasqua Rosée.

Publications
 Thomas Nicols' Lapidary, or, the history of pretious stones, the first work in English on gemstones.

Births
 3 March – Thomas Otway, dramatist (died 1685)
 John Radcliffe, physician (died 1714)

Deaths
 21 June – Inigo Jones, architect (born 1573)
 23 August – John Byron, 1st Baron Byron, royalist politician (born 1600)
 September – Ralph Hopton, 1st Baron Hopton, royalist commander (born 1596)
 8 October – John Greaves, mathematician and antiquarian (born 1602)

References

 
Years of the 17th century in England